Psiconautas is an Argentine TV comedy series, revolving around a Spanish hustler, who pretends to be a psychotherapist to a group of misfits to earn money. The first season debuted on Canal TBS in April 2016.  The second season was picked up by Netflix and debuted in April 2018.

Cast

 Willy Toledo as Roberto
 Gabriel Goity as Gorsky
 Julieta Zylberberg as Jessica
 Martín Piroyansky as Axel
 Florencia Peña as Fabiana
 Luis Ziembrowski as Coco
 Verónica Llinás as Emilce
 Emilio Disi as Giacomo
 Malena Villa as Debbie

References

2016 Argentine television series debuts
Spanish-language Netflix original programming
2010s Argentine comedy television series
Psychotherapy in fiction